Mariemont City School District is a public school district in Hamilton County, Ohio.

The Mariemont City School District is located east of Cincinnati, Ohio, United States and includes the villages of Fairfax, Terrace Park, Mariemont, and the unincorporated areas of Plainville and Williams' Meadow. The district can trace its founding to April 14, 1879.

Statistics

The Mariemont City School District consists of four schools. Total enrollment is approximately 1,700 students. At the time of the latest annual report, the district employed 188 certified and classified staff. There are two elementary principals, one junior high principal and one assistant principal and principal at the high school. General administration consists of the superintendent and treasurer.

Mariemont City Schools is ranked the #14 in Best School Districts in Ohio by Niche.

Academics 
Mariemont City School District offers college-prep curriculum, including honors and AP courses. The school offers a total of 19 AP courses.

Schools in the district
 Terrace Park Elementary
 Mariemont Elementary
 Mariemont Junior High School
 Mariemont High School

Athletics 
Mariemont City School District plays in the Cincinnati Hills League.

Ohio High School Athletic Association

State Records

State Championships 
Further information: Ohio High School Athletic Association

Division II

 Boys Soccer 2021
 Swimming Cora Dupre 200 Yard Freestyle 2019, 2017
 Swimming Cora Dupre 100 Yard Freestyle 2019, 2018
 Swimming Cora Dupre Girls 50 Yard Freestyle 2018
 Girls Lacrosse, 2018 (Final 4 2019)
 Boys Lacrosse 2017 (2nd 2019, Final 4 2018)

External links
Official website
https://www.niche.com/k12/d/mariemont-city-schools-oh/

References 

Education in Hamilton County, Ohio
School districts in Ohio
School districts established in 1879